The Scottish Episcopalians Act 1711 (10 Ann c 10) is an Act of the Parliament of Great Britain. Its purpose was "to prevent the disturbing those of the Episcopal Communion in Scotland in the Exercise of their Religious Worship and in the Use of the Liturgy of the Church of England and for repealing the Act passed in the Parliament of Scotland intituled Act against irregular Baptisms and Marriages".

This Act was partly in force in Great Britain at the end of 2010.

Section 3
This section was repealed by Part II of Schedule 1 to the Promissory Oaths Act 1871.

Section 4
This section was repealed by Part V of Schedule 1 to the Statute Law (Repeals) Act 1977.

Section 7
This section was repealed by section 28(20 of, and Schedule 3 to, the Marriage (Scotland) Act 1977

Section 13
This section was repealed by Part V of Schedule 1 to the Statute Law (Repeals) Act 1977.

See also
 Act Against Irregular Baptisms and Marriages, 1695
 Book of Common Prayer

References

External links
 

1711 in Scotland
Christianity and law in the 18th century
Acts of the Parliament of Great Britain concerning Scotland
Scottish Episcopal Church
Religion and politics
Marriage in Christianity
Baptism
Freedom of religion
Great Britain Acts of Parliament 1711
History of Christianity in Scotland
Marriage, unions and partnerships in Scotland
Law about religion in the United Kingdom
1711 in Christianity
Marriage law in the United Kingdom

Church of Scotland